Carolina Port was a football stadium in Dundee, Scotland. The sport's first major venue in the city, it was an early home of Dundee F.C. and staged Dundee's first international match in 1896.

History
East End, one of the leading Dundee clubs, were based at Carolina Port from 1891. When they merged with local rivals Our Boys to form Dundee F.C. in 1893, it was generally assumed that the new club – which had immediately secured election to the Scottish Football League – would base themselves at Carolina Port, which was the most developed ground in Dundee at that time. They were, however, surprisingly beaten to the punch by a comparatively modest local outfit, Strathmore, who secured the lease for themselves. As a result, Dundee began their campaign in the less imposing surroundings of Our Boys' former home, West Craigie Park. Strathmore's audacious move failed to pay off, and within a year they had merged with Johnstone Wanderers to form Dundee Wanderers, playing at Clepington Park. This left Carolina Port available for Dundee to move in midway through their debut season.

Having now become a regular venue for matches in Scotland's top flight, Carolina Port's prestige was further enhanced on 21 March 1896 when it hosted the Home International fixture between Scotland and Wales. Two Dundee players, Alex Keillor and William Thomson, were in the Scottish side. Keillor became the first Dundee player to score a goal for Scotland, as the home side ran out 4–0 winners.

Despite this, it was recognised that Carolina Port's location posed problems. Hemmed in amongst Dundee's harbour and overlooked by a huge pile of shale nicknamed the "burning mountain", future development of the stadium would be difficult. After a major reorganisation of the club in 1898, Dundee F.C. took the decision to relocate to a new site at Dens Park in the less built-up Clepington district. The club moved to their new ground in 1899 (where they are still playing well over 100 years later), and Carolina Port was rapidly consumed by the expansion of the harbour.

References

Defunct football venues in Scotland
Dundee F.C.
Scottish Football League venues
Scotland national football team venues
Sports venues completed in 1891
Football venues in Dundee